Pseudoalteromonas ruthenica is a marine bacterium isolated from the mussel Crenomytilus grayanus and the scallop Patinopecten yessoensis in the Gulf of Peter the Great, Sea of Japan.

References

External links
Type strain of Pseudoalteromonas ruthenica at BacDive -  the Bacterial Diversity Metadatabase

Alteromonadales
Bacteria described in 2002